Apocrinoceratidae constitutes a family of Middle Ordovician nautiloid cephalopods characterized by straight or slightly curved, transversely ribbed shells having siphuncles composed of expanded segments, short recurved septal necks, and thick connecting rings. Derivation is from the Protocycloceratidae, a family of ellesmerocerids, which differ in having straight or concave siphuncle segments, but are otherwise similar in form.

Apocrinoceratidae was established by Rousseau Flower (in Flower & Teichert, 1957) repeated in Flower (1964) for the genus Apocrinoceras (Teichert & Glenister, 1954). Four additional genera are included; Desioceras and Glenisteroceras (Flower and Teichert 1957, Flower 1964),Bakeroceras (Hook and Flower 1977), and Paldoceras (Kröger et al 2009).

Apocrinoceratidae was removed from the Ellesmerocerida to the Discosorida by Kröger et al (2009) based in the inclusion of Paldoceras interpreted as a morphologic intermediary between Apocrinoceras and Reudemannoceras. Paldoceras however is rather dissimilar, being more strongly cyrtoconic (curved) and lacking the characteristic annulations.

References

 Rousseau H Flower and Curt Teichert, 1957. The Cephalopod Order Discosorida. University of Kansas Paleontological Contributions. Mollusca Article 6. July 1, 1957.
 Rousseau H Flower 1964. The Nautiloid Order Ellesmeroceratida (Cephalopoda). New Mexico Bureau of Mines and Mineral Resources Memoir 12. 
 Björn Kröger, Yunbai Zhang, & Mare Isakar 2009. Discosorids and Oncocertids (Cephalopoda) of the Middle Ordovician Kunda and Aseri Regional Stages of Baltoscandia and the early evolution of these groups. Geobios, Vol. 42, No. 3 (May 2009) pp. 273–292.

Prehistoric nautiloid families
Middle Ordovician extinctions
Middle Ordovician first appearances
Taxa named by Rousseau H. Flower
Discosorida